El Capitan is a film by filmmaker Fred Padula that captures one of the earliest ascents of The Nose on El Capitan in Yosemite Valley, California. It has won several awards at film festivals around the world.

Plot
The film follows three climbers as they do the 3000-feet (900 m) vertical ascent of  The Nose, the classic first big-wall climb on El Capitan. A fourth climber follows the group and films their ascent but is never seen in the movie. The climbers need three days to reach the summit, which means they have to spend two nights sleeping on steep ledges, waking to magnificent views. Several minutes of the film are filmed in the pitch black when the climbers are caught by nightfall before reaching a ledge to spend the night. The screen is dark when one climber is heard trying to belay another when a bolt breaks loose and the climbers fall, luckily unharmed.

Climbers
 Gary Colliver
 Richard McCracken
 Lito Tejada-Flores
 Glen Denny (Filming)

Climbing techniques
The climbers use accepted climbing practices and state-of-the-art techniques appropriate to their climbing era.  For example, they wear tubular nylon webbing "swami belts" around their bodies and tie the rope into them rather than harnesses clipped to the rope with carabiners.  Also, though they use familiar hex nuts  they can also been seen hammering pitons into cracks for protection.

Production
Filming in 16mm format started on the wall 20 May 1968 and lasted through June, with additional scenes shot in the Fall and Spring 1969. The project was initially funded with the help of The North Face founder Doug Tompkins, who brought in his friend Peter J. Avenali, as well as by climber Glen Denny and the filmmaker. Subsequent funding came from the American Film Institute. The completed film eventually premiered at the San Francisco Museum of Modern Art in 1978. An early version of a digital remaster of the film was shown at the Banff Mountain Film Festival in 2007  In early 2013, the filmmaker finished a Kickstarter-funded digital restoration and re-issue on Blu-ray and DVD. The DVD and Blu-ray are being distributed by Western Eye Press  a company owned by Lito Tejada-Flores, one of the climbers featured in the film.

Awards
The film has received awards at the following film festivals:
 La Plagne
 Trento
 Les Diablerets
 Munich 
 Banff
 Telluride film festival

Notes

Climbing films
American adventure films
1978 films
1970s English-language films
1970s American films